The 1938 Italian Grand Prix was a Grand Prix motor race held at Monza on 11 September 1938.

Classification

References

Italian Grand Prix
Italian Grand Prix
Grand Prix